Theresa Lorraine Bazar (born 23 May 1955) is a Canadian-born singer, best known as one half of the pop duo Dollar.

Career
Bazar met with success in her late teens as a member of 1970s group Guys 'n' Dolls, who scored a 1975 hit with "There's A Whole Lot of Lovin'" and went on to have a period of chart success, which also included "Here I Go Again On My Own", a composition by the 17-year-old Bazar. Disillusioned with the direction of the group, her then-boyfriend and bandmate David Van Day left the group and when Bazar was subsequently dismissed by the group, they formed Dollar in 1977. Their hits began with "Shooting Star" in 1978. They then had several big hits including "Love's Gotta Hold on Me" in 1979, "Mirror Mirror" in 1981 and "Give Me Back My Heart" in 1982, until "Oh L'amour" which hit the Top 10 across Europe in 1987.

Bazar's solo career was less successful. Her album, The Big Kiss, as well as a single of the title track, were released in 1985.

She contributed vocals to two Gary Numan songs, "Noise Noise" and "Bridge, What Bridge?" which featured as b-sides to Numan's 1982 Top 20 single "Music for Chameleons".

She has occasionally returned to the UK to reform Dollar, for events such as the Prince's Trust's Tribute To Trevor Horn concert at Wembley Arena in November 2004; the Here and Now Tour and the reality television show Reborn in the USA in 2003.

In March 2008, Bazar and Van Day reunited with the other members of Guys 'n' Dolls for several TV appearances in the Netherlands. The original six members also reunited for a concert held in Amsterdam on 17 October.

In April 2008, Bazar and her son, Sam, appeared on the Australian television show, My Kid's a Star. In the first episode, Bazar talked about her career.

In August 2008, Bazar took part in a makeover show with Van Day called Pop Goes the Band, which was screened on Living TV in February 2009.

Solo career

Bazar released one solo studio album in 1985 called The Big Kiss, which she co-wrote. It was produced by Arif Mardin and featured the singles "The Big Kiss" and "Too Much in Love". The album reportedly cost half a million pounds to produce and generated media attention, but according to Bazar, the album's circulation was poor due to a mix-up at the record company, with the album unavailable at the time of its advertised release. Today Bazar mentions the incident as the most upsetting of her career, but she has high regard for the album, saying it had "a strong pedigree".

The same year, she recorded the theme song for the US film, Gotcha!. This was released as a single in the US.

In 2012, Bazar formed the new pop concept TnA Project. A single, "Hold Me on the Dance Floor", was recorded, with Bazar on lead vocals. The record was released in May 2012.

On 20 November 2019, Bazar played her first solo live show in London, singing songs from Guys 'n' Dolls through to Dollar.

Personal life
Bazar lived in Sydney, Australia throughout the 1990s and much of the 2000s before returning to England. She was married during the 1990s, but divorced in the mid-2000s.

References

External links
 
 
 

1955 births
Living people
English women singers
English dance musicians
Musicians from Toronto
Canadian emigrants to England
Canadian expatriates in England
MCA Records artists